Primary spine practitioners (also referred to as PSP, Spine Care Clinician, or Spine Care Specialist, or in the broader context a primary musculoskeletal specialist or provider) are health care professionals who are specially trained to provide primary care for patients with spinal disease.

The PSP has the training necessary to provide differential diagnosis, rule out serious pathology (such as infection, fracture, cancer, inflammatory joint disease) and provide evidence-based management for the majority of patients with spinal disease. Evidence-based treatment methods include spinal manipulation and manual therapy, rehabilitative exercises, patient education, motivational techniques and the application of psychological principles, particularly those of cognitive-behavioral therapy and acceptance and commitment therapy.

In addition, the PSP has the ability to recognize the relatively few patients who require special tests (radiography, MRI, laboratory workup) and invasive procedures (injections, surgery) and to serve as the center of care for the purpose of providing counseling for the patient, coordination of care and long term follow up.

An important aspect of this role is educating the patient on the risks, benefits and research evidence of all treatments for spinal pain so that, through a shared decision making process, appropriate choices can be made as to what is the best treatment for the patient. In addition, the PSP is tasked with helping the patient navigate the often-complex social systems, particularly for patients whose spinal disease arose from a work-related incident or personal injury.

History 

The concept of a spine care clinician or practitioner was first presented by neurologist Scott Haldeman in an editorial in The Spine Journal in 2001. The PSP role may include all clinical specialties that treat patients with spinal disease. This was emphasized at the American Back Society Annual Convention in San Francisco in November 2005.

At that time it was clear that none of the current clinical disciplines offering care to people with spinal disorders were adequately trained in the skills necessary to offer treatment protocols consistent with current evidence-based guidelines. The necessity to define a primary spine care clinician or specialist became even more evident when it was determined that there were over 200 treatment approaches available for people with spinal pain without any clinician with the knowledge, time, skills and ability to guide patients through this maze of treatment options.

Similar considerations were presented in the British Medical Journal by Harvigsen et al. which noted that the general medical practitioner is not adequately equipped to deal with the complexities of musculoskeletal disorders and suggested that the solution to this problem would be the development of a primary musculoskeletal specialist. Hartvigsen et al. suggests that chiropractors, physical therapists or osteopathic physicians could serve this purpose with some changes in education, clinical practice and licensure of these professions.

This has not gone unrecognized by these professions with a series of articles now appearing in chiropractic and physical therapy journals  suggesting that their professions are capable of assuming this role in the health care system and recommending that education and standards of practice be adopted so that their practitioners are in a position to assume this role in the future.

References 

Chiropractic
Physical therapy
Osteopathy
Osteopathic medicine
Allied health professions
Osteopathic manipulative medicine
Manual therapy
Musculoskeletal disorders
Alternative medicine